Maanaseega Kadhal is a 1999 Tamil-language film, written, directed and produced by actor Ravichandran, under his real name of B. S. Raman. The film stars Hamsavardhan and Sushva, while Ravichandran himself and Vaiyapuri portrayed supporting roles. The music for the film was composed by Deva and the film opened to negative reviews in November 1999.

Cast
Hamsavardhan as Hamsavardhan and Madhan
Sushva as Hamsavardhini
Nizhalgal Ravi
Rocky
Madhan Bob
Vaiyapuri
Master Mahendran
Ravichandran
Kottai Perumal
Manoj
K. Natraj

Production
The film marked the acting debut of Hamsavardhan, son of veteran Tamil actor Ravichandran. Ravichandran also made his directorial debut with this film.

Soundtrack
Lyrics were written by Kalidasan, Chidambaranathan, Na. Muthukumar and Bhavanidasan.

Release
Post-release, critic Balaji Balasubramaniam wrote "a lead pair that is — to put it nicely — not easy on the eyes, wooden performances, a laughably bad script, cheap comedy and a climax that is lifted from Kadhalukku Mariyadhai (1997) are only some of the things that are wrong with this movie" and that "with some unbearable songs and song sequences and you have yourself the leading contender for the worst movie of the year". In contrast, a reviewer from ChennaiOnline.com wrote "Not much was expected of the film, with great publicity surrounding it, but surprisingly it has turned out to be a fairly engaging entertainer". The critic added "the takings are slightly old fashioned, but there are some twists and turns in the script" an "the second half could have been better worked out".

References

1999 films
1990s Tamil-language films
Indian romance films
Films scored by Deva (composer)
1990s romance films
1999 directorial debut films